Nelshoogte Pass, also known as Nelsbergpas or Nelshoogte, is situated in the Mpumalanga province, on the Regional Road R38 between Barberton and Carolina (South Africa).

Mountain passes of Mpumalanga